Aurivilliola is a genus of harvestmen in the family Sclerosomatidae from South and Southeast Asia.

Species
 Aurivilliola annamensis Roewer, 1927
 Aurivilliola aurivillii (Thorell, 1894)
 Aurivilliola bispinifera Roewer, 1929
 Aurivilliola difformis Roewer, 1955
 Aurivilliola ephippiata Roewer, 1955
 Aurivilliola fagei Schenkel, 1963
 Aurivilliola femoralis Roewer, 1955
 Aurivilliola hirsuta Roewer, 1915
 Aurivilliola javana Roewer, 1931
 Aurivilliola nigripalpis Roewer, 1929
 Aurivilliola palpalis Roewer, 1915
 Aurivilliola segregata Roewer, 1955
 Aurivilliola sepia (Loman, 1892)
 Aurivilliola shanica Roewer, 1929
 Aurivilliola sumatrana Roewer, 1931
 Aurivilliola tibialis Roewer, 1955
 Aurivilliola timorensis Schenkel, 1944

References

Harvestmen
Sclerosomatidae